The Cello Concerto No. 2, W516, was composed by Heitor Villa-Lobos in Rio de Janeiro in 1953. It was commissioned by the cellist Aldo Parisot, to whom the score is dedicated. A reduction for cello and piano was published in Paris by Max Eschig.

The concerto was first performed by Aldo Parisot with the New York Philharmonic (Walter Hendl conducting) on February 5, 1955.

The orchestra calls for piccolo, two flutes, two oboes, cor anglais, two clarinets, bass clarinet, two bassoons, contrabassoon, four horns, two trumpets, three trombones, tuba, timpani, percussion (tam-tam, side drum, tambourine, suspended cymbal), celesta, harp, and strings. The work is in four movements:

References

Works cited

External links 
 Cello Concerto #2.

Villa-Lobos, Heitor No. 2
Compositions by Heitor Villa-Lobos